The hybrid elm cultivar Ulmus × intermedia 'Coolshade' is an American hybrid cultivar cloned from a crossing of the Slippery, or Red, Elm Ulmus rubra (female parent) and the Siberian Elm Ulmus pumila at the Sarcoxie Nurseries, Sarcoxie, Missouri, in 1946. At Arnold Arboretum, where there was a specimen, herbarium material was labelled Ulmus pumila 'Coolshade' (see 'External links').

Description
'Coolshade' has rapid, stocky growth with a compact crown resistant to breakage under ice and snow. Its foliage is a very dark green. There appears to be little evidence of Ulmus rubra ingression in the Arnold Arboretum 1960 leaves specimens labelled Ulmus pumila 'Coolshade', suggesting that its hybridity may have been questioned there.

Pests and diseases
Reputedly tolerant of Dutch elm disease, 'Coolshade' has not been tested by inoculation to determine the degree of resistance.

Cultivation
'Coolshade' was raised to create a disease-resistant tree that would not suffer the storm damage frequently sustained by the weak-wooded U. pumila. The tree was introduced to the UK in the 1960s but no longer survives there.

Cultivars
'Improved Coolshade'

Accessions

North America
Arnold Arboretum, US. Acc. no. 561–48

References

External links
 Sheet labelled U. pumila L. 'Coolshade' (Arnold Arboretum specimen 1, 1960)
 Sheet labelled U. pumila L. 'Coolshade' (Arnold Arboretum specimen 2, 1960)
  

Ulmus × intermedia cultivar
Ulmus articles missing images
Ulmus